Bohdan "Bud" Zip (March 5, 1929 – April 19, 2017) was a politician from Alberta, Canada. He served as a member of the Legislative Assembly of Alberta from 1982 to 1986.

Early life
Bohdan Zip was born in 1929 in the community of Yellow Creek, Saskatchewan.

Ukrainian community
Bohdan was actively involved in Calgary's Ukrainian community during the 1970s. He served as Chairman of the board for St. Vladimir's Ukrainian Greek-Orthodox Church. In 1976, he helped acquire funding to build a Ukrainian Cultural Centre in Calgary.

Political career
In the 1982 Alberta provincial election Bohdan was elected to the Legislative Assembly of Alberta for Calgary Mountain View for the Progressive Conservative Association of Alberta. He retired after serving one term as a back bench member. Zip died in Calgary in 2017 at the age of 88.

References

External links
Legislative Assembly of Alberta Members Listing
Build New Center For Ukrainians In Calgary, The Ukrainian Weekly, December 26, 1976, No. 255, Vol. LXXXIII

 

1929 births
Progressive Conservative Association of Alberta MLAs
Canadian people of Ukrainian descent
2017 deaths